Extended reality is a catch-all to refer to augmented reality (AR), virtual reality (VR), and mixed reality (MR). Sometimes the abbreviation “XR” is used to refer to all of them. The technology is intended to combine or mirror the physical world with a "digital twin world" that is able to interact with each other.  

The fields of virtual reality and augmented reality are rapidly growing and being applied in a wide range of areas such as entertainment, marketing, real estate, training, and remote work.

Multisensory extended reality 
Multisensory extended reality (XR) integrates the five traditional senses, including sight, hearing, smell, taste and touch. Perception involves signals that go through the nervous system, as vision involves light striking the retina of the eye, the smell is mediated by odor molecules, and hearing involves pressure waves. Sensory cues of multisensory extended reality include visual, auditory, olfactory, haptic, and environmental.

Scent is prominent in multisensory extended reality, as in biology, the olfactory system is integrated through the sensory nervous system. Multisensory experiences have elements of neuromorphic engineering, cognitive science, positive psychology, neuroenhancement, and nanoemulsion technology.

It is a form of limbic system health technology that includes digital therapeutics.

Multisensory experiences are biocentric, and may be designed to enhance user well-being via digital therapeutics by experiencing them as mood-enhancing technology with digital therapeutic effects, providing positive changes in perception, mood, cognition, and behavior.

Multisensory extended reality utilizes OpenXR and WebXR standards. It consists of perception, motor control, multisensory integration, vision systems, head-eye systems, and auditory processing. It is HCI human-computer interface technology. All of which require reverse-engineering of the retina.

Health and safety 
Researchers are conducting experiments to determine possible health hazards and safety measures. Robert Rauschenberger and Brandon Barakat conducted assessment using a variety of optometric, psychophysical and self-report measures. Their concurrent research to discover hidden health hazards in usage of VR in education concludes that this technology needs to be used safely by children in an educational use case. More examination needs to be done considering demographic and environmental parameter.

See also

 Computer-mediated reality
 Head-mounted display
 On-set virtual production
 OpenXR
 Smartglasses
 Virtual reality
 Wearable computing

References

Sources
 

Mixed reality
Reality by type
User interface techniques